La sedia della felicità is a 2013 Italian comedy film written and directed by Carlo Mazzacurati and starring Valerio Mastandrea and Isabella Ragonese. It premiered at the 2013 Torino Film Festival.

Cast 
Valerio Mastandrea as Dino
Isabella Ragonese as Bruna
Giuseppe Battiston as Father Weiner
Antonio Albanese as  Dante Becchin's Sons
 Raul Cremona as  Casimiro Foggia aka  Kasimir the Magician
 Cosimo Messeri as  Alex Pavelka
 Marco Marzocca as  The Florist
Milena Vukotic as  Armida Barbisan
 Natalino Balasso as  Volpato
 Mirko Artuso as  Bepin Lievore
 Roberto Abbiati as  Giani
 Lucia Mascino as  Elisa
Katia Ricciarelli as  Norma Pecche 
Roberto Citran as  The Fishmonger
Fabrizio Bentivoglio as The Art Critic
Silvio Orlando as The Art Vendor

Production  
The film was shot in Jesolo, Padua, the Euganean Hills, Abano Terme and the mountains of Trentino.

Release
The film premiered at the 31st edition of the Turin Film Festival.  It was released in theaters on April 24, 2014.

Awards and nominations
The film won the Silver Ribbon of the Year 2014. It also received eight David di Donatello nominations, including awards for Best Director, Best Supporting Actress (Milena Vukotic), Best Supporting Actor (Giuseppe Battiston) and Best Film.

References

External links

Italian comedy films
2013 comedy films
2013 films
Films scored by Mark Orton
2010s Italian-language films
2010s Italian films